Aditi Sharma may refer to:

 Aditi Sharma (actress, born 1983), Indian television and film actress
 Aditi Singh Sharma (born 1986), Indian playback singer
 Aditi Sharma (actress, born 1996), Indian television actress and model
 Aditi Sharma (cricketer) (born 1996), Indian cricketer

See also
 Aditi (disambiguation)